Álvaro Torres Masías (born 11 June 1993) is a Peruvian rower. He competed in the 2020 Summer Olympics. He also represented Peru at the 2019 Pan American Games finishing 5th in the double sculls final alongside Geronimo Hamann.

References

External links
 
 
 

1993 births
Living people
Sportspeople from Miami
Rowers at the 2020 Summer Olympics
Peruvian male rowers
Olympic rowers of Peru
Pan American Games competitors for Peru
Rowers at the 2015 Pan American Games
Rowers at the 2019 Pan American Games